Simon Phillip Hugh Callow  (born 15 June 1949) is a British actor, director, narrator and writer. Known as a character actor on stage and screen he's received numerous accolades including an Olivier Award and Screen Actors Guild Award as well as nominations for two BAFTA Awards. He was made a Commander of the Order of the British Empire (CBE) for his services to acting by Queen Elizabeth II in 1999.

Callow rose to prominence originating the title role of Wolfgang Amadeus Mozart in the 1979 Peter Shaffer play Amadeus for which he received a Laurence Olivier Award for Best Actor in a Supporting Role nomination. He joined the Miloš Forman 1984 film adaptation this time portraying Emanuel Schikaneder. In 1992 he won the Laurence Olivier Award for Best Director of a Musical for Carmen Jones. As an actor he won acclaim for his comedic roles in A Room with a View (1985) and Four Weddings and a Funeral (1994) earning BAFTA Award for Best Actor in a Supporting Role for each. Other notable roles include in Maurice (1987), Howards End (1992), Shakespeare in Love (1998), and The Phantom of the Opera (2004).

His television roles include Tom Chance in the Channel 4 series Chance in a Million (1984) and The Duke of Sandringham in the series Outlander from 2014 to 2016. He portrayed Napoleon in The Man of Destiny (1981), and Charles Dickens in numerous television projects. He's also appeared on numerous shows such as Midsummer Murders, Rome, Angels in America, Doctor Who, Galavant, Hawkeye, and The Witcher.

Early years
Callow was born on 15 June 1949 in Streatham, south London, the son of Yvonne Mary (née Guise), a secretary and Neil Francis Callow, a businessman. His father was of French descent and his mother was of Danish and German ancestry. He was raised as a Roman Catholic. Callow was a student at the London Oratory School in west Brompton, and then went on to study briefly at Queen's University Belfast in Northern Ireland, where he was active in the Gay liberation movement. He gave up his degree course after a year to take a three-year acting course at the Drama Centre London.

Career

Acting
Callow's immersion in the theatre began after he wrote a fan letter to Sir Laurence Olivier, the artistic director of the National Theatre and received a response suggesting he join their box-office staff. While watching actors rehearse, he realised he wanted to act.

Callow made his stage debut in 1973, appearing in The Three Estates at the Assembly Rooms Theatre, Edinburgh. In the early 1970s, he joined the Gay Sweatshop theatre company and performed in Martin Sherman's critically acclaimed Passing By. In 1977, he took various parts in the Joint Stock Theatre Company's production of Epsom Downs and in 1979, he starred in Snoo Wilson's The Soul of the White Ant at the Soho Poly.

Callow appeared as Verlaine in Total Eclipse (1982), Lord Foppington in The Relapse (1983) and the title role in Faust (1988) at the Lyric Hammersmith, where he also directed The Infernal Machine (with Dame Maggie Smith) in 1986. In 1985, he played Molina in Kiss of the Spiderwoman at the Bush Theatre, London. He played Mozart in the premiere of Peter Shaffer's Amadeus at the National Theatre (1979), also appearing in the 1983 BBC original cast radio production. He later wrote of having "discovered Mozart quite early: the operas, the symphonies, the concertos, the wind serenades were all very much part of my musical landscape when I was asked to play the part of the composer in Peter Shaffer's Amadeus; possibly this was one of the reasons I got the job." He appeared at the National Theatre as Orlando in As You Like It (1979) and Fulganzio in Life of Galileo (1980).

Callow appeared with Saeed Jaffrey in the 1994 British television drama series Little Napoleons, playing a scheming Conservative councillor in local government. In 1996, Callow directed Cantabile in three musical pieces (Commuting, The Waiter's Revenge, Ricercare No. 4) composed by his friend Stephen Oliver. Ricercare No. 4 was commissioned by Callow especially for Cantabile. He voice-acted the sly and traitorous Wolfgang in Shoebox Zoo. In 2004, he appeared on a Comic Relief episode of Little Britain for charity causes. In 2006, he wrote a piece for the BBC1 programme This Week bemoaning the lack of characters in modern politics. He has starred as Count Fosco, the villain of Wilkie Collins's novel The Woman in White, in film (1997) and on stage (2005, in the Andrew Lloyd Webber musical in the West End).

Callow starred in the three-part original Gold comedy The Rebel in 2016.

In 2022, he joined the cast of the UK revival of Cole Porter's Anything Goes replacing Gary Wilmot as Elisha Whitney. The production would complete a UK tour before finishing with a run at the Barbican Centre.
From 11 July to 3 August 2008, Callow appeared at the Stratford Shakespeare Festival in Canada in There Reigns Love, a performance of the sonnets of William Shakespeare. The same year, he appeared at the Edinburgh Festival, performing "Dr. Marigold" and "Mr. Chops" by Charles Dickens, adapted and directed by Patrick Garland; repeating them from December 2009 to January 2010 at the Riverside Studios and on tour in 2011.

In February 2008, he played the psychiatrist in the Chichester Festival Theatre's production of Peter Shaffer's Equus.

Between March and August 2009, he played Pozzo in Sean Mathias's production of Waiting for Godot by Samuel Beckett with Ian McKellen as Estragon, Patrick Stewart as Vladimir, and Ronald Pickup as Lucky. The production toured Britain before a run at the Theatre Royal, Haymarket, in London

From June to November 2010, he appeared in a national tour of a new one-man play, Shakespeare: the Man from Stratford, written by Jonathan Bate, directed by Tom Cairns, and produced by the Ambassador Theatre Group. The play was renamed Being Shakespeare for its West End debut at the Trafalgar Studios, where it opened on 15 June 2011. It was revived at the same theatre in March 2012, prior to a run in New York City and Chicago. In March 2014, it returned to the West End, this time at the Harold Pinter Theatre.

In October 2014, Callow appeared in a comedy sketch made for Channel 4's The Feeling Nuts Comedy Night to raise awareness of testicular cancer. The same year, he played the recurring role of the fictional Duke of Sandringham in the Starz period TV series, Outlander.

Film
He made his first film appearance in 1984 as Schikaneder in Amadeus. The following year, he appeared as the Reverend Mr. Beebe in A Room with a View. His first television role was in the Carry On Laughing episode "Orgy and Bess" in 1975, but it was cut from the final print. He starred in several series of the Channel 4 situation comedy Chance in a Million, as Tom Chance, an eccentric individual to whom coincidences happened regularly. Roles like this and his part in Four Weddings and a Funeral brought him to a wider audience. Callow portrayed Pliny the Elder in CBBC's 2007 children's drama series, Roman Mysteries in the episode "The Secrets of Vesuvius". He played Armand Duquesne in Marvel's Hawkeye on Disney+.

Directing
Callow also directed plays and wrote: his Being An Actor (1984) was a critique of 'director dominated' theatre, in addition to containing autobiographical sections relating to his early career as an actor. In 1992, he directed the play Shades by Sharman MacDonald and the musical My Fair Lady, featuring costumes designed by Jasper Conran. In 1995, he directed a stage version of the classic French film Les Enfants du Paradis for the Royal Shakespeare Company.

Among opera productions directed by Callow are a Così fan tutte in Lucerne, Die Fledermaus for Scottish Opera in 1988, Il tritico for the Broomhill Trust, Kent in August 1995, Menotti's The Consul at Holland Park Opera, London in 1999 and Le roi malgré lui by Chabrier at Grange Park Opera in 2003. He also directed Carmen Jones at the Old Vic, London in 1991, with Wilhelmenia Fernandez in the title role.

One of Callow's best-known books is Love Is Where It Falls, an analysis of his 11-year relationship with Peggy Ramsay (1908–91), a prominent British theatrical agent from the 1960s to the 1980s. He has also written extensively about Charles Dickens, whom he has played several times: in a one-man show, The Mystery of Charles Dickens by Peter Ackroyd; in the films Hans Christian Andersen: My Life as a Fairytale, and Christmas Carol: The Movie; and on television several times including An Audience with Charles Dickens (BBC, 1996) and in "The Unquiet Dead", a 2005 episode of the BBC science-fiction series Doctor Who. He returned to Doctor Who for the 2011 season finale, again taking the role of Dickens.

In December 2004, he hosted the London Gay Men's Chorus Christmas Show, Make the Yuletide Gay at the Barbican Centre in London. He is currently one of the patrons of the Michael Chekhov Studio London.
In July 2006, the London Oratory School Schola announced Callow as one of their new patrons. In November 2007, he threatened to resign the post over controversy surrounding the Terrence Higgins Trust (an AIDS charity of which Callow is also a patron). Other patrons of the Catholic choir are Princess Michael of Kent and the leading Scottish composer James MacMillan. He reprised his role as Wolfgang in Shoebox Zoo and voice-acted the wild and action-seeking Hunter, as well.

Author
Callow has written biographies of Oscar Wilde, Charles Laughton, Orson Welles, and Richard Wagner. He has also written an anthology of Shakespeare passages, Shakespeare on Love, and contributed to Cambridge's Actors on Shakespeare series.

A devotee of classical music, he has contributed articles to Gramophone.

Narration
Callow was the reader of The Twits and The Witches in the Puffin Roald Dahl Audio Books Collection, and has done audio versions of several abridged P.G. Wodehouse books that feature, among others, the fictional character Jeeves. They include Very Good, Jeeves and Aunts Aren't Gentlemen. Callow is the reader of the audio book edition of William E. Wallace's Michelangelo, God's Architect, published by Princeton University Press. Callow narrated the audiobook of Robert Fagles' 2006 translation of Virgil's The Aeneid. In November 2009, "Mini Stories", a recording by the Caput Ensemble of Haflidi Hallgrimsson's settings of the surreal poetry of Daniil Kharms, featuring Callow as the narrator, was released by Hyperion Records.

Personal life
Callow was listed 28th in The Independent 2007 listing of the most influential gay men and women in the UK. In the 1999 Birthday Honours, he was appointed Commander of the Order of the British Empire (CBE) for his services to acting. He was one of the first actors to declare their homosexuality publicly, doing so in his 1984 book Being An Actor.

He married Sebastian Fox in June 2016.

In an interview, Callow stated: I'm not really an activist, although I am aware that there are some political acts one can do that actually make a difference and I think my coming out as a gay man was probably one of the most valuable things I've done in my life. I don't think any actor had done so voluntarily and I think it helped to change the culture.

In August 2014, Callow was one of 200 public figures who were signatories to a letter to The Guardian expressing their hope that Scotland would vote to remain part of the United Kingdom in September's referendum on that issue.

Filmography

Film

Television

Bibliography

References

External links

Selected performances in Bristol University Theatre Archive

Simon Callow at the British Film Institute
Simon Callow's – MusicalTalk discussing his role as Captain Hook in Peter Pan at the Richmond Theatre, Christmas 2008.
Simon Callow – Downstage Center interview at American Theatre Wing.org, September 2006
Simon Callow on BBC1's This Week
theartsdesk Q&A: Simon Callow (2 October 2010)

1949 births
Living people
20th-century biographers
20th-century English male actors
21st-century biographers
21st-century English male actors
Alumni of Queen's University Belfast
Alumni of the Drama Centre London
Audiobook narrators
Biographers of artists
Commanders of the Order of the British Empire
English biographers
English male film actors
English male stage actors
English male television actors
English male voice actors
English people of Danish descent
English people of French descent
English people of German descent
English Roman Catholics
English theatre directors
English gay actors
English gay musicians
English gay writers
English LGBT actors
LGBT theatre directors
English LGBT writers
Male actors from London
Male biographers
New Statesman people
Outstanding Performance by a Cast in a Motion Picture Screen Actors Guild Award winners
People educated at London Oratory School
People from Streatham
Royal Shakespeare Company members
Theatre World Award winners
20th-century English LGBT people
21st-century English LGBT people